"Tomorrow Can Wait" is an electro house song performed by French DJ David Guetta, American singer Chris Willis and German DJ Tocadisco from Guetta's third studio album, Pop Life. The song was released as the album's fifth single on 7 July 2008. A music video was first released onto YouTube on 15 August 2008 at a total length of three minutes and forty-seven seconds.

Track listing
From Discogs.

 French CD single
 "Tomorrow Can Wait" (radio edit) – 3:10
 "Tomorrow Can Wait" (club mix) – 6:44

 European CD single
 "Tomorrow Can Wait" (radio edit) – 3:10
 "Tomorrow Can Wait" (Tocadisco Evil Mix) – 6:07
 "Tomorrow Can Wait" (Arias Seat Ibiza Remix) – 7:21
 "Tomorrow Can Wait" (Sharam Remix DG Edit) – 6:21
 "Tomorrow Can Wait" (club mix) – 6:44

Charts

Weekly charts

Year-end charts

Release history

References

2008 singles
David Guetta songs
Songs written by David Guetta
Songs written by Joachim Garraud
Songs written by Karen Poole
Chris Willis songs
2007 songs
Ultra Music singles
Song recordings produced by David Guetta